Boating on the River Epte (also known as The Canoe on the Epte) is an 1890 oil painting by French impressionist artist Claude Monet. It is currently housed at the São Paulo Museum of Art.

Between 1887 and 1890 Monet concerned himself with portraying scenes from the River Epte, which skirted his property at Giverny. The sisters Suzanne and Blanche Hoschedé posed for this series of pictures, their late father being banker Ernest Hoschedé, a patron of the arts and collector of Monet, and their mother, Alice, who became Monet's second wife. This series began with La Barque Rose (private collection) and also worthy of mention are canvases La Barque à Giverny (Musée d'Orsay, Paris) and En Barque (National Museum of Western Art, Tokyo). The São Paulo Museum of Art picture, which also has a preparatory study, was mentioned by the artist himself on a letter to critic and friend Geffroy, dated June 22, 1890: “I am again vexed by things that are impossible to do: water with undulating vegetation on the bottom”. In fact one of the more singular characteristics of The Canoe on the Epte in the Monet context is the proximity of the water, which assumes at the lower part of the composition an almost tactile reality, as if the painter for once did not want to depict the luminous reflections of its surface, but its depth. Although it belongs to a series, the São Paulo work is in this particular a unique case. Monet here announces materiality: this new visual dimension of water will only be obtained again over thirty years later in his paintings of the 1918-1924 period. His friendship with photographer Nadar and his genuine interest in photography explain the framing of the composition as well as the out-of-focus effect produced by the movement of the boat on the water to be seen in the Hoschedé sisters. In addition, a possible source of the São Paulo Museum of Art composition, as has been detected, is the Harunobu engraving, titled Woman Collecting Lotus Flowers.

See also
List of paintings by Claude Monet

Notes

References

Lobello, Marino (edit). Catalogue of the Museu de Arte de São Paulo Assis Chateaubriand: French Art, Northern Europe, Eastern Europe. São Paulo: Prêmio, 2008, pp. 256–257.

Paintings by Claude Monet
1890 paintings
Paintings in the collection of the São Paulo Museum of Art
Maritime paintings